Maria Idolina Landolfi (born 19 May 1958 in Rome – died 27 June 2008 in Florence) was an Italian novelist, poet and literary critic. She was daughter of the writer Tommaso Landolfi and the principal curator of his works.

In 1996 she founded the Landolfian Studies Center, of which she was the president until her death. He collaborated on the cultural pages of the newspaper Il Giornale until May 2008.

Her personal library was donated to the Humanist Library of Siena.

Prose and poetry 
Scemo d'amore : racconti, Roma, Empiria, 1998. 
I litosauri, Roma, Laterza, 1999. 
Senza titolo testo di Idolina Landolfi, xilografia di Antonio Baglivo, Salerno, SemInAria, 2001
con Ester Pes, Attacchi d'amore, Milano, ES, 1996. 
Sotto altra stella, Pasian di Prato, Campanotto Editore, 1996
Matracci e storte: novelle e novellette mercuriali, Napoli, Graus, 2004. 
Non mi destare, amore, Firenze, Il Bisonte, 2010

Translations 
 Gina Barkhordar Nahai, L' incanto del pavone, traduzione di Idolina Landolfi e William S. Maury, Milano, Rizzoli, 1991
 Annie Ernaux, Passione semplice, Milano, Rizzoli, 1992
 Isidore Ducasse, comte de Lautréamont, I canti di Maldoror. Poesie. Lettere, introduzione, traduzione e note di Idolina Landolfi, Milano, 1995
 Matthew Kneale, Nero Tamigi, Milano, Bompiani, 1997
 Jean-Claude Lavie, L' amore e il delitto perfetto, Milano, Baldini & Castoldi, 1998
 Donna Tartt, Dio di illusioni, Milano, Rizzoli, 1998
 Villiers de l'Isle-Adam, Claire Lenoir, Latina, L'Argonauta, 1999
 Murray Bail, Eucalyptus, Milano, Mondadori, 1999
 Paule Constant, Confidenza per confidenza, Milano, Rizzoli, 2000
 Michel Tournier, Eleazar, ovvero La sorgente e il roveto, Milano, Garzanti, 2000
 Adam Armstrong, Il grido della pantera, Milano, Rizzoli, 2001
 Elie Wiesel, Michael de Saint Cheron, Il male e l'esilio : dieci anni dopo, Milano, Baldini & Castoldi, 2001
 Frances Mayes, Sotto il sole della Toscana, Milano, Rizzoli, 2001
 Frances Mayes, ''Beautiful Toscana, Milano, Rizzoli, 2001
 Michel Tournier, "Celebrazioni", Milano, Garzanti, 2001
 Darin Strauss, Chang and Eng Bunker, Milano, Rizzoli, 2001
 Jean-Christophe Grangé, Il concilio di pietra, Milano, Superpocket, 2003
 Jean-Christophe Grangé, Il volo delle cicogne, Milano, Garzanti, 2003
 Jean-Christophe Grangé, I fiumi di porpora, Milano, Garzanti, 2005
 Donna Tartt, Il piccolo amico, traduzione di Idolina Landolfi e Giovanni Maccari, Milano, Superpocket, 2005
 Eva Stachniak, Il giardino di Venere, Milano, Rizzoli, 2005

Notes

External links
 
 Centro Studi Landolfiani Web Site

1958 births
2008 deaths
Writers from Rome
Italian literary critics
Italian women literary critics
Italian poets
Italian women poets
20th-century Italian women writers
20th-century Italian dramatists and playwrights
Italian women dramatists and playwrights